TulTul, Del Medio and Pocitos are three volcanoes in Argentina. Small Inka shrines have been found on their summits.

Since the Jurassic, subduction off the western margin of South America has generated volcanism, which after starting in the Cordillera de la Costa now occurs in the Andes. Since the Oligocene, the Puna has been volcanically active as well. There, some stratovolcanoes including TulTul, Del Medio and Pocitos are aligned on the Calama-Olacapato-El Toro fault which cuts across the plateau in southeast direction.

Tul Tul had a central vent which formed andesitic lava flows and later above these lava flows dacitic domes.

The volcanoes were active 8 to 6 million years ago, during the Miocene. Lava domes were emplaced on all three volcanoes late in their history. The magmas that constructed these volcanoes appear to have originated in the lower crust from a garnet-bearing precursor. Moraines developed at elevations exceeding  elevation on Del Medio and Pocitos, consisting of   features on the walls of a cirque and two lateral moraines downvalley. These moraines formed before the last glacial maximum, but during wet periods in the Salar de Uyuni.

References

External links 
 Geología y petrología de los volcanes cenozoicos Pocitos, Del MEdio y Tul Tul, provinciade Salta, Argentina

Volcanoes of Argentina
Miocene stratovolcanoes
Miocene lava domes